Bondo is a town in Uganda.

Location
Bondo is located in Arua District, West Nile sub-region, in Northern Uganda. The coordinates of the town are: 02 47 00N, 30 58 00E.

Overview
The town lies on the Arua-Nebbi Highway which continues on to Gulu, the largest city in Northern Uganda. Bondo also lies along the path of the 33kV electric power line from Nyagak Power Station in Paidha, Nebbi District, connecting to Arua, through Nebbi, Okollo and Bondo.

Points of interest
Some of the points of interest in the town include the following:

 The offices of Bondo Town Council
 Bondo Central Market
 The Arua-Gulu Road - The all-tarmac road passes through the middle of town
 The 33kV electric power line from Paidha, Zombo District to Arua, Arua District - The power transmission line also passes through Nebbi in Nebbi District and through Okollo in Arua District.

See also
Nyagak Power Station
Nyagak II Power Station
Nyagak III Power Station
Paidha

References

External links
Google Map of Bondo, Uganda

Populated places in Uganda
Arua District